Jack Anstey (born 1997) is an Australian professional track athlete, specializing in the 800m and 1500m events. Before turning pro, in 2021 he graduated from Illinois State University, where he was an All-American. In February 2019, in the state of Iowa (US), Anstey became the 68th Australian male to run under 4 minutes for the full mile, with a time of 3:59.66. He also became just the 12th Australian to achieve this feat indoors.

Personal life
Anstey was born in April 1997, to Gail and Leigh, and grew up in Toowoomba, Queensland, where he attended Toowoomba State High School. While in high school, Anstey won various state titles in events ranging from the 800m to cross country. After early successes, he was granted regular opportunities to compete nationally, mainly competing in the 800m and 1500m. After completing high school, Anstey moved to the United States to further his running career in the NCAA, for Illinois State University, where he competed in the Missouri Valley Conference. Since competing for Illinois State University, he has become an NCAA Division I All American after finishing seventh in the 1500m at the 2019 NCAA Division I Outdoor Track and Field Championships in Austin, Texas. Upon graduation, Anstey turned professional.

Personal bests
 800m: 1:48.78
 1500m: 3:36.54
1500m indoor: 3:38.65
Mile: 3:55.41
Mile indoor: 3:56.17
3000m indoor: 7:55.45

References 

Australian runners
1997 births
Living people
Illinois State Redbirds track and field
Illinois State Redbirds athletes